Osiek Wielki is a village in the administrative district of Gmina Osiek Mały, within Koło County, Greater Poland Voivodeship, in west-central Poland.

The village has a population of 680.

References

Osiek Wielki